Adelphicos visoninum, the Middle American burrowing snake, is a species of colubrid snake found in Mexico and Guatemala.

References

Adelphicos
Reptiles of Mexico
Reptiles of Guatemala
Reptiles described in 1866
Taxa named by Edward Drinker Cope